Charles N. Hunter may refer to:

Charles Newtown Hunter, soldier and author of a book on his combat experiences in Burma during World War II
Charles Norfleet Hunter, newspaper editor and civil rights campaigner

See also
Charles Hunter (disambiguation)